CF Market Mall is one of the largest malls (by area) in Calgary, Alberta, Canada (900,490 square feet/83,658.3 m²). It is located in Varsity, a suburban neighbourhood in the city's northwest quadrant on Shaganappi Trail. The mall is jointly owned (50/50) by Cadillac Fairview and Ivanhoé Cambridge, two of Canada's largest real estate property managers and developers, but managed by the former.

History
Opened in August 1971, one of the original anchor stores were Woodward's Stores Ltd, with their Food Floor and Bargain Centre (which was a separate store in the mall).

In 1977, Famous Players opened its doors at the mall. It was removed during the food court expansion in 1987. The mall underwent major expansions in 1988 and 2004. The latest expansion added the south wing, an underground parkade, a larger food court, and a complete renovation of the existing centre. The centre has a one-level 'racetrack' layout, or figure eight.

In 2012, longtime anchor tenant Zellers closed; it was redeveloped as a Target store, which opened on May 6, 2013, but closed in April 2015.

As of October 5, 2017, the anchor store previously containing Kmart, Zellers, and Target has redeveloped as several smaller retailers, including a Sporting Life location.

In late 2019, a "luxury" Landmark Cinemas movie theatre opened in the southwest corner of the mall property where Staples used to be located.

See also

 List of shopping malls in Canada
 List of attractions and landmarks in Calgary

References

External links

Shopping malls in Calgary
Shopping malls established in 1971
Ivanhoé Cambridge
Cadillac Fairview